Pseudosphex eumenoides is a moth of the subfamily Arctiinae. It was described by Max Gaede in 1926. It is found in Brazil.

References

Pseudosphex
Moths described in 1926